Woodbridge is a census-designated place in San Joaquin County, California. The 2010 United States census reported Woodbridge's population was 3,984. Founded in the 1850s, the town is listed as a California Historical Landmark.

Woodbridge is located on the northwest side of the city of Lodi, along the banks of the Mokelumne River. Prior to the 2010 census, it was split between the CDPs of North Woodbridge and South Woodbridge and occupies the zip code 95258. It is most known for being in California's San Joaquin Valley winegrowing region.

History
Woodbridge was founded in 1852 by Jeremiah H. Woods and Alexander McQueen, who established a ferry across the Mokelumne River. The ferry enabled a new road to be routed between Stockton and Sacramento. In 1858 they built a wooden bridge at the site of the ferry which became known as Woods' Bridge, from which the community drew its name. Woods hoped that the settlement would grow larger than Stockton, and even hoped to form a separate county, Mokelumne County, with Woodbridge as the seat. In 1867, however, the railroad chose to bypass Woodbridge and lay tracks through neighboring Lodi instead.

Woodbridge then became an educational center, with the Woodbridge Seminary and San Joaquin Valley College both opening doors in 1879. The college closed in 1897 due to declining enrollment.

Geography
According to the United States Census Bureau, the CDP covers an area of 3.1 square miles (8.1 km), 3.0 square miles (7.8 km) of which is land, 0.1 square miles (0.3 km) of it (3.42%) water.

Demographics
The 2010 United States Census reported that Woodbridge had a population of 3,984. The racial makeup of Woodbridge was 2,997 (75.2%) White, 15 (0.4%) African American, 46 (1.2%) Native American, 201 (5.0%) Asian, 7 (0.2%) Pacific Islander, 582 (14.6%) from other races, and 136 (3.4%) from two or more races. Hispanic or Latino of any race were 1,234 persons (31.0%).

The Census reported that 3,969 people (99.6% of the population) lived in households, 15 (0.4%) lived in non-institutionalized group quarters, and 0 (0%) were institutionalized.

There were 1,430 households, out of which 492 (34.4%) had children under the age of 18 living in them, 916 (64.1%) were opposite-sex married couples living together, 153 (10.7%) had a female householder with no husband present, 68 (4.8%) had a male householder with no wife present.  There were 58 (4.1%) unmarried opposite-sex partnerships, and 8 (0.6%) same-sex married couples or partnerships. 237 households (16.6%) were made up of individuals, and 96 (6.7%) had someone living alone who was 65 years of age or older. The average household size was 2.78.  There were 1,137 families (79.5% of all households); the average family size was 3.10.

The population was spread out, with 965 people (24.2%) under the age of 18, 323 people (8.1%) aged 18 to 24, 826 people (20.7%) aged 25 to 44, 1,317 people (33.1%) aged 45 to 64, and 553 people (13.9%) who were 65 years of age or older.  The median age was 42.6 years. For every 100 females, there were 97.2 males.  For every 100 females age 18 and over, there were 95.7 males.

The homeowner vacancy rate was 1.2%; the rental vacancy rate was 4.1%.  2,790 people (70.0% of the population) lived in owner-occupied housing units and 1,179 people (29.6%) lived in rental housing units.

Notable people
 Ross Thomas (born 1981), actor and filmmaker, was raised in both Stockton, California and Woodbridge.

References

Census-designated places in San Joaquin County, California
Census-designated places in California